The men's 3000 metres steeplechase was the only steeplechase on the Athletics at the 1968 Summer Olympics program in Mexico City.  It was held on 14 October and 16 October 1968.

Four years earlier, Benjamin Kogo was the only Kenyan in the field, not making it out of the qualifying round.  On the final lap, Kogo was in third place and his teammate was back in fifth behind Soviet Aleksandr Morozov with 200 metres to go.  George Young had a few metres lead on Kerry O'Brien.  In the 50 metres going into the water jump, Kogo passed O'Brien and pulled even with Young.  Kogo took that water jump so much faster than Young, he gained a foot and had the momentum to carry him several metres into the lead.  Young was straining to hold off O'Brien over the final barrier.  O'Brien even checked over his left shoulder to make sure Morozov was not coming.  Simultaneously Biwott was about to pass him on right.  Biwott took the hurdle awkwardly, almost landing on both feet.  But Biwott had more speed, leaving O'Brien and Young then sprinting past Kogo on to a three-metre victory.

Since this 1-2 victory, Kenya has gone on to dominate the event in the Olympics.  Except for the two boycott years of 1976 and 1980, Kenya has won more than 2/3 of all medals offered, usually going 1-2 and sweeping the event twice.

Results

Round One
The first rounds were held on October 14.  The fastest four athletes in each of the three heats advanced to the Final Round.

Heat One

Heat Two

Heat Three

Final
The final was held on October 16.  Biwott amazed the crowd leaping over the water jump using long jump-type technique, completely clearing the water. His barrier technique was also unique and he jumped with both feet together rather than in a hurdling technique.  Benjamin Kogo led the final thru the kilometer but at the bell George Young joined him.  Young took the lead with 300 to go, but Biwott ran down everybody in the final straight to win the gold medal. This began the Kenyan dominance of the steeplechase event.

References

Athletics at the 1968 Summer Olympics
Steeplechase at the Olympics
Men's events at the 1968 Summer Olympics